Stigmella basiguttella is a moth of the family Nepticulidae. It is found in all of Europe, except Ireland and Iceland. It is also found in south-west Asia up to northern Iran. It has recently been recorded from Azerbaijan, Georgia and Tunisia.

Adults are on wing from May to June and from July to September.

The larvae feed on Castanea sativa, Quercus castaneifolia, Quercus cerris, Quercus frainetto, Quercus macrolepis, Quercus petraea, Quercus pubescens, Quercus pyrenaica, Quercus robur and Quercus rubra. They mine the leaves of their host plant. The mine consists of a long, slowly widening, slender corridor. Frass completely fills the corridor.

References

External links
The Quercus Feeding Stigmella Species Of The West Palaearctic: New Species, Key And Distribution (Lepidoptera: Nepticulidae)

Nepticulidae
Moths described in 1862
Moths of Africa
Moths of Asia
Moths of Europe